Destiny is a studio album by American R&B group Shai. It was released on February 16, 1999, by Big Play Records.

It was their first album as a trio, after the departure of Carl Martin.

Critical reception
The New York Post called the album "a mature, solid collection that should get this D.C.-based band some deserved national attention." MTV wrote that Destiny "is more blunder than wonder, the group a mere shadow of a once-vibrant R&B ensemble."

Track listing
"Destiny" – 5:14
Featuring KRS-One
"Before I Go" – 3:54
"Zodiac" – 4:52
"He's Doing You Wrong" – 4:24
"Last Time We Talked" – 4:53
"(Interlude)" – 0:49
"Can't Stop the Rain" – 4:56
"Hard When You Love Someone" – 4:16
"Hold on to Love" – 4:44
Featuring Miss Jones
"You Got Me Twisted" – 3:36
"Sunshine" – 4:32
"If I Spend the Night" – 7:05

References

1999 albums
Shai (band) albums